Thomas Luther Shepherd (1829 – 28 October 1884) was a 19th-century Member of Parliament from the Otago region in New Zealand.

References

1829 births
1884 deaths
Members of the New Zealand House of Representatives
New Zealand MPs for South Island electorates
19th-century New Zealand politicians